Frei Church is a parish church of the Church of Norway in Kristiansund Municipality in Møre og Romsdal county, Norway. It is located in the village of Nedre Frei on the southern shore of the island of Frei. It is the church for the Frei parish which is part of the Ytre Nordmøre prosti (deanery) in the Diocese of Møre. The yellow, wooden church was built in a long church style in 1897 by the architect Karl Norum. The church seats about 420 people.

History
The earliest existing historical records of the church date back to 1432, but the church was not new that year. It may have been founded during the 14th century. The church was a long church design with a sacristy on the east end and a church porch on the north side where the main entrance was located. The building was renovated in 1665. During the renovation, a tower was built on the roof above the nave. Prior to 1665, there was a small free-standing bell tower. In October 1766, the church was struck by lightning and it burned down. The church was rebuilt on this new site the following spring of 1767. The new church was a timber-framed cruciform design with a sacristy on the east end.

In the spring of 1896, the church was torn down. A new church was built from 1896 to 1897 on the same site. Some of the materials of the old church were preserved and re-used in the construction of the present church building. The church was designed by Karl Norum. The new building was consecrated on 16 September 1897. It is a wooden, dragestil long church with a tower on the west end and a choir on the east end that was flanked by a sacristy on the north and south side of the choir.

See also
List of churches in Møre

References

Buildings and structures in Kristiansund
Churches in Møre og Romsdal
Long churches in Norway
Wooden churches in Norway
19th-century Church of Norway church buildings
Churches completed in 1897
14th-century establishments in Norway